Richard (Dick) Francis Haskayne,  (born December 18, 1934) is a Canadian businessman and philanthropist.

Early life and education
Raised in Gleichen, Alberta, he received a Bachelor of Commerce degree from the University of Alberta in 1956 and became a Chartered Accountant in 1959.

Career
He spent more than twenty years with Hudson's Bay Oil and Gas Company becoming president in 1980. He was chairman, president and chief executive officer of Interhome Energy Inc. From 1996 to 1998, he was chairman of TransAlta Corporation. From 1996 to 1999, he was chairman of the board of MacMillan Bloedel Limited when it was acquired by Weyerhaeuser. From 1992 to 1998, he was chairman of NOVA Corporation when the company merged with TransCanada Pipelines Limited. He retired from TransCanada Pipelines in 2005.

From 1990 to 1996, he was the chair of the board of governors of the University of Calgary and is currently board chair emeritus.

In May 2002, after Haskayne donated C$16 million, the University of Calgary renamed their management faculty the Haskayne School of Business.

Awards and recognition
In 1997, he was made an Officer of the Order of Canada for "his high ethical business standards" and for having "helped lead fund-raising campaigns for several organizations such as the University of Calgary and the United Way." He is a Fellow of the Canadian Institute of Chartered Accountants (F.C.A.). He was inducted into the Canadian Business Hall of Fame, the Calgary Business Hall of Fame, and the Canadian Petroleum Hall of Fame. He is a member of the Advisory Council of the Order of Canada.  He sits on the board of directors for the Alberta Bone and Joint Health Institute. and is also a member of the Community and Partners Advisory Committee of the Libin Cardiovascular Institute of Alberta.

In 2006, he received the Alberta Order of Excellence.

Published works
Haskayne's memoir Northern Tigers: Building Ethical Canadian Corporate Champions was published on March 28, 2007 by Key Porter Books.

References

External links
Richard Haskayne website
Northern Tigers: Building Ethical Canadian Corporate Champions
Memoir of a tiger: Community leader Dick Haskayne chronicles his career in new book May 4, 2007, University of Calgary

1934 births
Living people
Businesspeople from Calgary
Canadian accountants
Canadian philanthropists
Members of the Alberta Order of Excellence
Officers of the Order of Canada
University of Alberta alumni
Weyerhaeuser